Arthur Bartholomew may refer to:

 Arthur Bartholomew (illustrator) (1833–1909), English-born Australian engraver, lithographer and natural history illustrator
 Arthur Bartholomew (cricketer) (1846–1940), English cricketer and schoolmaster
 Arthur Wollaston Bartholomew (1878–1945), British Army officer
 Arthur H. Bartholomew, mayor of Ansonia, Connecticut